Lithophane ponderosa is a species of cutworm or dart moth in the family Noctuidae. It is found in North America.

The MONA or Hodges number for Lithophane ponderosa is 9924.1.

References

Further reading

 
 
 

ponderosa
Articles created by Qbugbot
Moths described in 2003